Henrik Gjesdal (born 19 July 1993) is a Norwegian professional footballer and chess player who plays for Kristiansund, as a centre back.

Career
In April 2013 he signed his first contract with Brann, due after the 2013 season, after 7 years as a youth player. Gjesdal became a first team regular due to injuries on fellow centre backs Markus Jonsson and Simen Wangberg, and was called up to the national under-21 team. He debuted on 5 June as a substitute in a friendly match against Finland. On 3 October 2013 he signed a contract keeping him with Brann until the end of the 2015 season. Before the last game of the 2013 season against Tromsø, he was named Young Player of the Year by the supporters. Despite this, on 12 March 2014 it was announced that Gjesdal would leave on a four-month-long loan to 1. divisjon club Nest-Sotra.

In summer 2014 Gjesdal signed a -year contract with Tromsø.

Career statistics

References

External links

1993 births
Living people
Footballers from Bergen
Norwegian footballers
Norway under-21 international footballers
SK Brann players
Nest-Sotra Fotball players
Tromsø IL players
Kristiansund BK players
IK Start players
Eliteserien players
Norwegian First Division players
Association football defenders